The 2005 Formula Renault 2.0 Germany season was the fourteenth Formula Renault 2.0 Germany season and the last before merging into Formula Renault 2.0 Northern European Cup. The season began at Oschersleben on 23 April and finished on 9 October at the same venue, after sixteen races.

SL Formula Racing driver Pekka Saarinen won two races on his way to championship title. Mikhail Aleshin of the Lukoil Racing Team, who won the opening race and four-time winner Filipe Albuquerque of the Motopark Oschersleben team, completed the top three.

Drivers and teams

Race calendar and results

Standings
Point system :  30, 24, 20, 17, 16, 15, 14, 13, 12, 11, 10, 9, 8, 7, 6, 5, 4, 3, 2, 1 for 20th. No points for Fastest lap or Pole position.
Races : 2 races per round, 25 minutes long each.

The series also rewarded the best Rookie driver (R) with 7, 5, 3, 1 points for the first four drivers in qualifying and in the races, plus 3 points for fastest lap and for pole position.

(R) = Rookies standing

References

External links
 Official website of the Formula Renault 2.0 Germany championship

Germany
Formula Renault 2.0
Renault